(not adam) is an EP by Australian musical project Foetus, released in 2004 by Ectopic Ents/Birdman.  (not adam) was released as a teaser EP for the Love album.

Track listing

Personnel
Adapted from the (not adam) liner notes.
Musicians
 J. G. Thirlwell – vocals, instruments, production
 Kurt Wolf – guitar (2)
Production and additional personnel
 J. G. Thirlwell – Production, direction, sleeve design
 Jay Wasco – Remix, additional production and arrangement (2)
 Charles Pierce – Remix and additional production (4)

Release history

References

External links
 (not adam) at foetus.org

2004 EPs
Foetus (band) albums
Albums produced by JG Thirlwell